Holme (or Holme on Swale) is a small village and civil parish in the Hambleton District of North Yorkshire, England. It is located near Pickhill, Sinderby and Ainderby Quernhow, on the west bank of the River Swale.  The population of the civil parish was estimated at 60 in 2014.

Hambleton Ales is a small brewery which started life in Holme. It has now moved to Melmerby.

Holme was historically a township in the ancient parish of Pickhill with Roxby in the North Riding of Yorkshire. At the time of the Domesday Book in 1086 it belonged to the Bishop of Durham as part of his manor of Hutton Conyers and Howgrave. The township was for that reason referred to as Holme cum Howgrave. Holme became a separate civil parish in 1866.

References

External links

Villages in North Yorkshire
Civil parishes in North Yorkshire